Ameera Shah (born 24 September 1979 ) is an Indian entrepreneur and the managing director of Metropolis Healthcare, a multinational chain of pathology centers based in Mumbai, with presence in seven countries. She is the daughter of Dr Sushil Shah, the founder and chairman of Metropolis Healthcare. She has been honored as a 2015 Young Global Leader by the World Economic Forum.

She was named to Fortune India's "Most Powerful Women in Business" list in 2017, 2018, and 2019. Shah was featured in the list of Forbes India's Tycoons of Tomorrow 2018.

Early life
Ameera Shah was born to Dr. Sushil Shah, a pathologist, and Dr. Duru Shah, a gynaecologist. She belongs to a family of doctors in Mumbai. Her elder sister Aparna Shah is a geneticist. She studied commerce at junior college in H.R. College of Commerce and Economics. She obtained a degree in finance from the University of Texas at Austin.

She used to work with Goldman Sachs in New York. Later, she completed the Owner-President Management Program at Harvard Business School. Shah is an industry spokesperson and has been featured as a speaker in various National and International forums, industry events and conclaves. She has spoken at events organized by Indian Institute of Management Ahmedabad, Harvard Business School, TED, and CII.

Career

Metropolis Healthcare 
She took over her father's pathology business- Metropolis Lab in 2001. She subsequently transformed a single diagnostic lab which had a revenue of about $1.5 million and 40 employees, to Metropolis Healthcare, a multinational chain of 125 diagnostic labs with $90 million in revenue and 4,500 employees. She successfully led the listing of the company in April 2019.

Board memberships and affiliations 
She serves as a Board Member of Marico Kaya Enterprises Limited and the Managing Director of Metropolis Healthcare Limited. She is presently the Independent Director at Torrent Pharmaceuticals Limited., Shoppers Stop Limited and Kaya Limited She is an advisor to Baylor College of Medicine. She is also on the global advisory board of AXA.

Shah has also served as secretary of the Indian Association of Pathology Laboratories (IAPL) and co-chairperson of Federation of Indian Chambers of Commerce and Industry (FICCI) Health Services Committee in 2012.

Other ventures
Between 2016 and 2017, she starred in and was an investor on the startup reality television show The Vault.

In 2017, Shah founded Empoweress, a not-for-profit initiative for women-led businesses to find advice, mentorship and micro-funding.

Honours and awards
CNBC-AWAAZ CEO Awards 2019
Business Today's Most Powerful Women list, 2018, 2019
Tycoons of Tomorrow by Forbes India, 2018
India's Most Powerful Women in Business (ranked at no. 28) by Fortune India Magazine, 2019
India's Most Powerful Women in Business (ranked at no. 36) by Fortune India Magazine, 2018
India's Most Powerful Women in Business (ranked at no. 46) by Fortune India Magazine, 2017
Asia's Power Business Women 2015, Forbes
Young Global Leader, World Economic Forum, 2015
 Women Leadership Award at the CMO Asia Awards, 2015
Exemplary Women Leadership Award, World Women Leadership Congress & Awards, 2014
 40 Under 40 Business Leaders by The Economic Times
Young Achiever of the Year, CMO Asia Awards, 2011
 Young Entrepreneur of the Year Award, 2011 by Entrepreneur India & Bloomberg

See also 
 Metropolis Lab

References

External links

Living people
Harvard Business School alumni
Businesspeople from Mumbai
21st-century Indian businesswomen
21st-century Indian businesspeople
1979 births
Businesswomen from Maharashtra
McCombs School of Business alumni
Indian businesspeople in the healthcare industry